Charles McLaren may refer to:

Charles McLaren, 1st Baron Aberconway (1850–1934), Scottish politician and lawyer
Charles McLaren, 3rd Baron Aberconway (1913–2003), British industrialist and horticulturalist
Charles McLaren, 4th Baron Aberconway (born 1948), British nobleman
Charles Stephen McLaren (born 1984), heir apparent to the Barony of Aberconway
Charles McLaren (psychiatrist) (1882–1957), Australian psychiatrist and missionary

See also
Charles Maclaren (1782–1866), Scottish editor